Yaroslav Igorevich Starobogatov (13 July 1932 – 3 December 2004) was a Russian zoologist, professor and chief scientist at the Zoological Institute of the Russian Academy of Sciences. His research was on invertebrate zoology, particularly on molluscs (malacology) and crustaceans (carcinology). He also was a major contributor to the higher systematics of living organisms, to micro- and macroevolution and to Soviet and world-wide biogeography.

He described a great number of new animal species.

Taxa named in his honour 
 Neopilina starobogatovi Ivanov & Moskalev, 2007

References

External links 
ПРОФЕССОР Я. И. СТАРОБОГАТОВ (1932–2004). Zhurnal obshchei biologii (2012)
  "Старобогатов Ярослав Игоревич (1932–2004)". www.biogeographers.dvo.ru
РАЗВИТИЕ ИДЕЙ БИОГЕОГРАФИИ, ТАКСОНОМИИ И ТЕОРЕТИЧЕСКОЙ БИОЛОГИИ В РАБОТАХ ЯРОСЛАВА ИГОРЕВИЧА СТАРОБОГАТОВА (1932–2004) Vestnik SVNTs DVO RAN (2012)

Russian malacologists
1932 births
2004 deaths
Moscow State University alumni
Soviet zoologists
20th-century Russian zoologists